The Kentucky Stakes was a Thoroughbred horse race run between 1870 and 1938 at Saratoga Race Course in Saratoga Springs, New York. Raced on dirt, it was originally open to two-year-olds of either sex but after the event was placed on hiatus following the 1894 running it was revived in 1901 as a selling race for two-year-old fillies.

Historical notes
The inaugural running of the Kentucky Stakes was contested at 6 furlongs and was won by Harry Bassett, a three-time Champion and future U.S. Racing Hall of Fame inductee. The early races for colts and fillies produced two more Hall of Fame winners, Parole in 1875 and Emperor of Norfolk in 1887. 

The final running of the Kentucky Stakes took place on August 15, 1932, and was won by Alfred G. Vanderbilt Jr.'s Spot News.

Winners

References

Discontinued horse races in New York (state)
Flat horse races for two-year-old fillies
Flat horse races for two-year-olds
Saratoga Race Course
Recurring sporting events established in 1870
Recurring sporting events disestablished in 1939
1870 establishments in New York (state)
1939 disestablishments in New York (state)